Danza III: The Series of Unfortunate Events is the third album by American mathcore band The Tony Danza Tapdance Extravaganza.  The album was released July 6, 2010 via Guy Kozowyk's Black Market Activities. Danza III is noted for being the first TTDTE album to feature its new lineup, most notably guitarist and primary songwriter Joshua Travis from Calico System, a band where he previously played guitar.

Critical reception

Danza III has received generally positive reception. The NewReview gave the album 4.5 out of 5 stating, "simply put, The Tony Danza Tapdance Extravaganza has summoned one of the most vile sounding and entertaining extreme music releases of the year."  Skulls N Bones writer Carlos Moreno gave the album an extremely positive review, even going so far as to call it "the best CD of 2010 in [his] professional opinion."

Allmusic's Greg Prato scored the album 2.5 out of 5, commenting that the album was surely one of the most ferocious works to come from a fairly young band. However, he was more critical of the repetitive quality of the nonstop sonic onslaught, which he suggests begins to work against the band as many of the songs become increasingly predictable.

Track listing

Personnel
The Tony Danza Tapdance Extravaganza
 Jessie Freeland - vocals
 Josh Travis - guitar, bass guitar
 Mike Bradley - drums

Production
Josh Travis - producer
Jeremiah Scott - engineer
Nick Zampiello - mastering
Rob Gonnella - mastering
Steve Blackmon - mixing
Michael J. Windsor - art direction and design

References 

2010 albums
Black Market Activities albums
The Tony Danza Tapdance Extravaganza albums